Torver is a village and civil parish in the South Lakeland district of Cumbria, England,  south west of the village of Coniston and  west of Coniston Water.

Farming has always played an important part in Torver's history, though slate mining increased when the Coniston branch of the Furness Railway was opened in the 19th century (it subsequently closed in 1958). Nowadays, the hamlet remains a starting point for many walks around the Duddon Valley and Coniston Water, an area popularised by William Wordsworth.

Governance
Torver is part of the Westmorland and Lonsdale parliamentary constituency, of which Tim Farron is the current MP representing the Liberal Democrats.

Before Brexit, it was in the North West England European Parliamentary Constituency.

Owing to the minimal population details are maintained under the parish of Blawith and Subberthwaite.

See also

Listed buildings in Torver

References

External links
 Cumbria County History Trust: Torver (nb: provisional research only – see Talk page)

Villages in Cumbria
South Lakeland District
Civil parishes in Cumbria
Furness